"Something old, something new", a traditional rhyme about what a bride should wear at her wedding for good luck

Something old, something new may also refer to:

Media
"Something Old, Something New", an episode of the television series The Apprentice
"Something Old, Something New", an episode of the television series The Hills
"Something Old, Something New", an episode of the television program Project Runway Canada
Something Old, Something New (album), a 1963 studio album by Dizzy Gillespie 
Something Old, Something New, an album by Don Cherry
Something Old, Something New, an album by Billy Parker
Something Old, Something New, an album by Stéphane Grappelli
Something Old, Something New, a 1966 album by The Olympics
Something Old, Something New, an album by Jerry Jerome
Something Old, and Something New!, a 1959 album by Sammy Herman, xylophonist
Something Old, Something New, Something Blue, Something Else!, an album by The Crickets
Something Old, Something New, an album by Chris Duarte
"Something Old, Something New", a 1971 song recorded by the Fantastics

See also
"Something Old", an episode of the TV series How I Met Your Mother